Heterocrossa exochana is a species of moth in the family Carposinidae. It is endemic to New Zealand.

Taxonomy 
This species was described by Edward Meyrick in 1888 using material he collected in Nelson in January. In 1922 Meyrick classified Heterocrossa as a synonym of the genus Carposina. George Hudson discussed and illustrated this species in his 1928 publication The Butterflies and Moths of New Zealand. In 1978 Elwood Zimmerman argued that the genus Heterocrassa  should not be a synonym of Carposina as the genitalia of the species within the genus Heterocrassa are distinctive. In 1988 John S. Dugdale assigned the species back to the genus Heterocrossa. The holotype specimen is held at the Natural History Museum, London.

Description 

This species was described by Meyrick as follows:

Distribution 
This species is endemic to New Zealand. Other than its type locality of Nelson, this species has been collected in Masterton, Wellington, Christchurch, Dunedin and Invercargill. The species has also been collected in Fiordland and Hawkes Bay.

Biology and behaviour 
The adults of this moth are on the wing in from September to May. This species is attracted to light.

Host species 
The larvae of this species feed on the fruits of Muehlenbeckia species.

References

External links

Image of holotype specimen

Carposinidae
Moths of New Zealand
Moths described in 1888
Endemic fauna of New Zealand
Taxa named by Edward Meyrick
Endemic moths of New Zealand